Hard Labor Creek may refer to:

Hard Labor Creek (Georgia), stream in Morgan County, Georgia
Hard Labor Creek Observatory, observatory in Rutledge, Georgia
Hard Labor Creek Regional Reservoir, reservoir in Walton County, Georgia
Hard Labor Creek State Park, Georgia state park

See also
Hard labor (disambiguation)